Precis actia, the air commodore,  is a butterfly in the family Nymphalidae. It is found in Angola, the southern part of the Democratic Republic of the Congo, Uganda, Rwanda, Burundi, Kenya, Tanzania, Malawi, northern Zambia, Zimbabwe, and western Mozambique. The habitat consists of Brachystegia woodland and savanna.

Both sexes are attracted to flowers and males also engage in mud-puddling.

The larvae feed on Platostoma species.

References

Butterflies described in 1880
Junoniini
Butterflies of Africa
Taxa named by William Lucas Distant